Souzána Antonakáki (Greek: Σουζάνα Αντωνακάκη; 25 June 1935 – 5 July 2020) was a Greek architect.

Souzána Maria Kolokytha was born in 1935 in Athens and studied at the School of Architecture of the National Technical University of Athens from 1954 to 1959. She and her husband, Dimítris Antonakákis (born 22 December 1933), along with Eleni Gousi-Desylla, founded Atelier 66 in 1965 in Athens, often associated with the architectural movement called "critical regionalism". She was a member of the French Academy of Architecture (Academie d 'Architecture) and the National Secretariat of the UIA.

Souzána Maria Antonakáki died on 5 July 2020, in Athens, aged 85.

References

1930s births
2020 deaths
Architects from Athens
20th-century Greek architects
Greek women architects